Is It Wrong to Try to Pick Up Girls in a Dungeon? is a Japanese light novel series written by Fujino Ōmori and illustrated by Suzuhito Yasuda. The story follows the exploits of Bell Cranel, a 14-year-old solo adventurer under the goddess Hestia. As the only member of the Hestia Familia, he works hard every day in the dungeon to make ends meet while seeking to improve himself. He looks up to Ais Wallenstein, a famous and powerful swordswoman who once saved his life, and with whom he fell in love. He is unaware that several other girls, deities and mortals alike, also develop affections towards him; most notably Hestia herself, as he also gains allies and improves himself with each new challenge he faces.

SB Creative has published the light novels since January 15, 2013 under their GA Bunko imprint. As of January 24, 2023, eighteen volumes have been published. The series has estimated sales of over 1,500,000 copies. Yen Press has licensed the series in North America and released the first volume under the Yen On imprint in December 2014. The light novel ranked at No. 4 in 2014 in Takarajimasha's annual light novel guide book Kono Light Novel ga Sugoi!.

Volume list

Is It Wrong to Try to Pick Up Girls in a Dungeon?

Familia Chronicle
The Familia Chronicle light novels are a series of side stories that go more in-depth on characters that do not get as much attention in the main storylines of Danmachi and Sword Oratoria.

References

Is It Wrong to Try to Pick Up Girls in a Dungeon?